Kiranmoy Nanda (born 16 May 1944) is an Indian politician, belonging to the Samajwadi Party. He was the Fisheries Minister in the Left Front cabinet in the state of West Bengal since 1982 till 2011 when he was succeeded by Congress MLA Abu Hena. Nanda was the general secretary of the West Bengal Socialist Party for many years. Nanda served as general secretary of the Samajwadi Party between 1996 and 2000 as the WBSP had merged with SP. In 2000, after the Kolkata Municipal Corporation election, Nanda broke with SP and reconstituted the WBSP. In April 2010 he again became general secretary of SP, as WBSP again merged with SP. Nanda replaced Amar Singh.

Nanda is the son of Jyotirmoy Nanda, a prominent academic and social worker in Mugberia in East Midnapore district. Kiranmoy Nanda began his political activism in the All India Students Federation (the student wing of the Communist Party of India). Nanda was elected to the West Bengal Legislative Assembly as a Janata Party candidate from the Mugberia assembly constituency in 1977. He joined the WBSP when it was constituted in 1981. He won the Mugberia seat again in 1982, 1987, 1991, 1996, 2001 and 2006. His share of votes has ranged from 58.42% (1987) and 46.94% (1977). He faced a tough challenge as he contested the 2011 Assembly polls from a Congress stronghold - North Dinajpur's Raiganj (Vidhan Sabha constituency). His string of electoral victories since 1982 tore as he faced a humiliating defeat to the Congress candidate Mohit Sengupta, an aide of Raiganj Congress MP Deepa Dasmunshi.

Nanda came under criticism from other Left Front partners after he had called for early assembly elections following a parliamentary by-poll election in 2009.

Nanda opposes the 'Operation Green Hunt', the paramilitary operation of the Indian government against Maoist guerrillas.

Kiranmoy Nanda's brother Brahmamoy Nanda was a MLA from Narghat for 20 Years (1991-2011), elected as a WBSP candidate, but he also lost the 2011 West Bengal Assembly election from the Nandakumar (Vidhan Sabha constituency).

References

Samajwadi Party politicians from West Bengal
People from Purba Medinipur district
Living people
State cabinet ministers of West Bengal
Nanda Kiranmoy
1944 births
West Bengal MLAs 1977–1982
West Bengal MLAs 1982–1987
West Bengal MLAs 1987–1991
West Bengal MLAs 1991–1996
West Bengal MLAs 1996–2001
West Bengal MLAs 2001–2006
West Bengal MLAs 2006–2011